Winneshiek County is a county located in the U.S. state of Iowa. As of the 2020 census, the population was 20,070. The county seat is Decorah.

History
A largely rural and agricultural county, Winneshiek County has a rich cultural history from Czech, Slovak, English, Irish, German, Swiss, and Norwegian immigrants that have settled within its boundaries.

The county was originally settled in 1848 in present-day Bloomfield Township (near Castalia, Iowa) and in Washington Township (near Fort Atkinson, Iowa). It was organized in 1847, and named after a chief of the Winnebago tribe.

In 1980, Winneshiek County reported a population of 21,842. Like much of Iowa during the 1980s it witnessed a population loss, dropping to 20,847 according to the 1990 United States Census. However, during the 1990s the county experienced some mild growth and was able to rise above the 21,000 mark once again.

Government and elected officials
As of 2010, the Winneshiek County government had a total of 785 employees and staff.

Politics
Like all Iowa counties, Winneshiek is governed by an elected partisan Board of Supervisors. Winneshiek County's Board of Supervisors has five members elected by single-member districts of equal population. Other elected officials are the county attorney, auditor, sheriff and treasurer. The offices for the supervisors and county officers are located in the County Courthouse at the county seat.

Political culture

Geography

Major highways
 U.S. Highway 52
 Iowa Highway 9
 Iowa Highway 24
 Iowa Highway 139
 Iowa Highway 150

Adjacent counties
Fillmore County, Minnesota (northwest)
Houston County, Minnesota (northeast)
Allamakee County (east)
Fayette County (south)
Chickasaw County (southwest)
Howard County (west)
Clayton County (southeast)

Demographics

2020 census
There were 8,916 housing units, of which 8,170 were occupied.

2010 census
There were 8,721 housing units, of which 7,997 were occupied.

2000 census

As of the census of 2000, there were 21,310 people, 7,734 households, and 5,189 families residing in the county. The population density was 31 people per square mile (12/km2). There were 8,208 housing units at an average density of 12 per square mile (5/km2). The racial makeup of the county was 97.85% White, 0.51% Black or African American, 0.08% Native American, 0.82% Asian, 0.24% from other races, and 0.50% from two or more races. 0.80% of the population were Hispanic or Latino of any race. 38.3% were of German, 31.7% Norwegian, 5.5% Irish and 5.1% Czech ancestry.

There were 7,734 households, out of which 30.9% had children under the age of 18 living with them, 58.9% were married couples living together, 5.5% had a female householder with no husband present, and 32.9% were non-families. 27.6% of all households were made up of individuals, and 12.3% had someone living alone who was 65 years of age or older. The average household size was 2.46 and the average family size was 3.03.

In the county, the population was spread out, with 23.0% under the age of 18, 16.7% from 18 to 24, 24.2% from 25 to 44, 20.4% from 45 to 64, and 15.7% who were 65 years of age or older. The median age was 36 years. For every 100 females there were 96.8 males. For every 100 females age 18 and over, there were 94.3 males.

The median income for a household in the county was $38,908, and the median income for a family was $45,966. Males had a median income of $29,278 versus $21,240 for females. The per capita income for the county was $17,047. About 5.1% of families and 8.0% of the population were below the poverty line, including 6.5% of those under age 18 and 10.5% of those age 65 or over.

Communities

Cities

Calmar
Castalia
Decorah
Fort Atkinson
Jackson Junction
Ossian
Ridgeway
Spillville

Census-designated place
Burr Oak

Other unincorporated communities
Bluffton
Festina
Frankville
Highlandville
Hesper
Kendalville

Townships

 Bloomfield
 Bluffton
 Burr Oak
 Calmar
 Canoe
 Decorah
 Frankville
 Fremont
 Glenwood
 Hesper
 Highland
 Jackson
 Lincoln
 Madison
 Military
 Orleans
 Pleasant
 Springfield
 Sumner
 Washington

Ghost towns
 Conover
Moneek
Sattre
Canoe

Population ranking
The population ranking of the following table is based on the 2020 census of Winneshiek County.

† county seat

Education
The following school districts have their administrative headquarters in the county:
 Decorah Community School District
 South Winneshiek Community School District
 Turkey Valley Community School District

North Winneshiek Community School District was in the county, until it merged with Decorah CSD on July 1, 2018. The Decorah district and the Mabel-Canton Public Schools in Minnesota have an agreement where people who live in the Decorah district but closer to the Mabel-Canton schools than to Decorah schools can enroll in Mabel-Canton schools.

The following school districts have their administrative headquarters outside of the county but serve sections of Winneshiek County:
 Allamakee Community School District
 Howard–Winneshiek Community School District
 Postville Community School District

See also

National Register of Historic Places listings in Winneshiek County, Iowa

References

External links

Winneshiek County - Official County Government site
Winneshiek County Health and Demographic Data
1913 History of Winneshiek County
Official Winneshiek County Fair site

 
Iowa placenames of Native American origin
1847 establishments in Iowa
Driftless Area
Populated places established in 1847